K. P. Parameswaran (Kodunthirapully Parameswaran) (Malayalam: കെ.പി.പരമേശ്വരന്‍ (കൊടുന്തിരപ്പുള്ളി പരമേശ്വരന്‍))(Tamil: கே.பி.பரமேஸ்வரன் (கொடுந்திறப்புள்ளி பரமேஸ்வரன்)) is a professional mridangam artiste (AIR 'A' Grade Artiste).He is a prime disciple of Sangeetha Kalanidhi Dr.T.K.Murthy. He has performed all over India and abroad with various stalwarts of Carnatic Music. He is a torch bearer of the Thanjavur style of mridangam playing.

Early life 
K. P. Parameswaran was born on 17 July 1969 to Late K.S.Padmanabha Iyer and K.P.Lokanayaki in Kodunthirapully Village, Palakkad, Kerala. He was initiated to the mridangam by his grandfather Late Sri Kodunthirapully Swaminatha Iyer , who himself was a great mridangam artist who was a disciple of K.Ponnaiah Pillai, Thanjavur Vaidyanatha Iyer and Palghat Mani Iyer. Parameswaran had rigorous training under his grandfather in mridangam. He then went to Mridangam Legend Sangeetha Kalanidhi Dr T.K.Murthy for the higher studies in mridangam in 1987. He had Gurukulavasam Training under Dr T.K.Murthy for 15 years (1987-2002).

Career 
He successfully completed Ganabhushanam Course under Sri Parassala Ravi in Palakkad Music College. While under the guidance of Dr T.K.Murthy, he played many double mridangam concerts and mridangam demonstrations with his teacher and adopted the same style as his guru in both accompanying for the songs and in the solo performances. During that time, he was awarded the central government scholarship for his prodigious and meritorious talent in mridangam and for training under Dr. T.K. Murthy. He has also played in the commercially released CD named 35 Thalas, 72 Mela Kartha Thalas & 108 Thalas, produced by his Guru, Dr. T.K. Murthy. He has accompanied many stalwarts during his illustrious career. Some of the musicians he has accompanied are listed below.

 Sri. K.V. Narayanaswamy                             
 Sri. B. Rajam Iyer
 Sri. T.K Govinda Rao
 Sri. M.S. Gopalakrishnan
 Sri. Madurai T.N. Seshagopalan
 Sri. T.V. Sankara Narayanan
 Sri. Thrissur V. Ramachandran
 Smt. Radha Viswanathan
 Smt. Suguna Purushothaman
 Smt. Suguna Varadachari
 Smt. M.S.Sheela
 Smt. Panthula Rama
 Sri. Neyveli Santhanagopalan
 Sri. Karaikudi Subramaniam
 Sri. Vijay Shiva
 Sri. Lalgudi G.J.R. Krishnan
 Sri. Trichy Ganeshan
 Sri. Sanjay Subramanyam
 Sri. T.M. Krishna
 Sri. T.N.S. Krishna
 Sri. Ashok Ramani
 Sri. Kadri Gopalnath
 Sri. Mandolin Srinivas
 Pandit Ronu Majumdar

He is an 'A' Graded artist of All India Radio (AIR). He is a torch bearer of the Thanjavur style of Mridangam playing. Apart from playing he is also a good mridangam teacher. He has many number of disciples who are already prominent in the field.

Awards and titles 
Kodunthirapully Parameswaran is awarded with many titles. 

 Asthana Vidwan By Kanchi Kamakoti Peetham
 Sangeetha Thilakam By Thirvambadi Devaswom, Thrissur
 Laya Vadya Nipuna By Kerala Brahmana Sabha
 Laya Vidhyacharya Mani By Nandhikeshwar Thala Vidyalaya, Chrompet, Chennai

External links 

Official Website
In a Lec Dem With His Guru Dr T.K.Murthy
Accompanying Smt Radha Viswanathan (Daughter of Bharat Ratna M.S.Subbulakshmi)

References

Mridangam players
Tamil musicians
1969 births
Living people